Joel Genazzi (born February 10, 1988) is a Swiss professional ice hockey defenceman who currently plays for and is an alternate captain of Lausanne HC of the National League (NL).

Playing career
Genazzi made his National League (NL) debut playing with HC Fribourg-Gottéron during the 2006–07 season.

Genazzi failed to establish himself in the National League over 3 seasons with Fribourg and was loaned multiple times to various Swiss League (SL) teams. He had a breakout season in 2008–09 with Young-Sprinters HC, putting up 42 points (15 goals) in 42 games in the SL. Genazzi went on to play one more year in the SL with EHC Visp in 2009–10, racking up an impressive 51 points over 46 games. His stellar season allowed him to sign with the SCL Tigers of the National League for the next year.

Genazzi played 3 seasons with the Tigers before joining Lausanne HC for the 2013–14 season. At the conclusion of the season, Genazzi agreed to a two-year contract extension with Lausanne. On October 24, 2016, Genazzi was signed to a five-year contract extension worth CHF 3 million by Lausanne.

International play
Genazzi was a member of Switzerland's silver medal team at the 2018 IIHF World Championship. He played 5 of the team's 10 games.

Career statistics

Regular season and playoffs

International

References

External links
 

1988 births
Living people
HC Fribourg-Gottéron players
Lausanne HC players
Neuchâtel Young Sprinters HC players
SCL Tigers players
Swiss ice hockey defencemen
EHC Visp players
Ice hockey people from Zürich